Paratetralophodon is an extinct genus of proboscidean from late Neogene deposits in India and China. Although traditionally classified in the family Gomphotheriidae, recent studies find it to be more closely related to modern elephants.

Paratetralophodon hasnotensis, found in the Siwalik Hills of northern India, is the only unequivocal species in the genus, but the Far Eastern form "Tetralophodon" exoletus is tentatively considered referable to this genus based on similarities with P. hasnotensis, while specimens from Lantian, China, appear to represent an unnamed species of Paratetralophodon.

References 

Elephantoidea
Prehistoric placental genera
Miocene proboscideans
Pliocene proboscideans
Miocene mammals of Asia